Khalid Sekkat (born on 12 May 1984 in Fes) is a Moroccan footballer who plays for Wydad Casablanca and the Moroccan national team.

References

External links
 Wydad Profile

Living people
1984 births
Association football midfielders
Moroccan footballers
Moroccan expatriate footballers
Ligue 1 players
Ligue 2 players
Wydad AC players
Stade de Reims players
Expatriate footballers in France
People from Fez, Morocco